The Coonabarabran Times is a weekly newspaper published each Thursday in Coonabarabran, New South Wales, Australia.

History 
In 1927 Coonabarabran Clarion, Bligh Watchman (Coonabarabran) and Baradine Advocate combined to form Coonabarabran Times. The Bligh Watchman had been in publication since 1879 and was also known as the Bligh Watchman and Coonabarabran Gazette. The Coonabarabran Clarion had been in publication since 1911. The paper's circulation declined from 2,898 in 1970 to 2,800 in 1980 and further to 2,503 in 1990. Its current circulation is 2,700.

Digitisation 
This newspaper has not yet been digitised.

See also 
 List of newspapers in Australia
 List of newspapers in New South Wales

References 

Newspapers published in New South Wales
Weekly newspapers published in Australia